Arlington House is a 58-metre high eighteen-storey residential apartment block in Margate, Kent, England.

It was built in 1964, it has 142 apartments, and was designed by Russell Diplock & Associates, developed by Bernard Sunley Trust, and built by the contractors Bernard Sunley & Sons.

The sides of the building have a wave-like design, providing both inland and sea views.

It was initially advertised as "Britain's first ‘park and buy’ shopping centre with luxury flats", incorporating a theatre, restaurant and rooftop swimming pool.

The poet and vocalist for Hawkwind, Robert Calvert lived at Arlington House.

References

External links

 Facebook page
 Arlington House Residents Association 

Buildings and structures in Kent
Margate
Apartment buildings in England